Oak mistletoe is a common name for several plants and may refer to:

Phoradendron coryae, native to western North America
Phoradendron leucarpum, native to central North America
Phoradendron villosum, native to far western North America